David J. Sloane (born April 6, 1985) is an American former professional ice hockey defensemen and right winger. He played in one National Hockey League (NHL) game with the Philadelphia Flyers during the 2008–09 season. As a youth, he played in the 1999 Quebec International Pee-Wee Hockey Tournament with the Philadelphia Flyers minor ice hockey team.

Career statistics

See also
List of players who played only one game in the NHL

References

External links
 

1985 births
Adirondack Phantoms players
American men's ice hockey defensemen
American men's ice hockey right wingers
Binghamton Senators players
Chicago Steel players
Cincinnati Cyclones (ECHL) players
Colgate Raiders men's ice hockey players
Elmira Jackals (ECHL) players
Ice hockey players from Pennsylvania
Kalamazoo Wings (ECHL) players
Living people
People from Ambler, Pennsylvania
Philadelphia Flyers players
Philadelphia Phantoms players
Undrafted National Hockey League players